Vasili Tokranov (born August 2, 1989) is a Russian professional ice hockey defenceman who currently plays for Ak Bars Kazan in the Kontinental Hockey League (KHL).

Playing career
Tokranov made his debut in the KHL with Ak Bars Kazan in the inaugural 2008–09 season, appearing in two post-season games.

After claiming the Gagarin Cup with Kazan in the 2017–18 season, Tokranov became a free agent after spending his entirety of his 11-year professional career with Kazan. On May 21, 2018, he agreed to a lucrative four-year contract with SKA Saint Petersburg.

At the conclusion of his four-year tenure with SKA, Tokranov opted to return to his original club, Ak Bars Kazan, in signing a two-year deal on 12 May 2022.

Awards and honors

References

External links

1989 births
Living people
Ak Bars Kazan players
SKA Saint Petersburg players
Universiade medalists in ice hockey
Universiade gold medalists for Russia
Competitors at the 2011 Winter Universiade
Russian ice hockey defencemen